The Legacy is a student-run newspaper at Lindenwood University in the U.S. state of Missouri, which is published every Tuesday during the Fall and Spring semesters. The online version of The Legacy is hosted by College Publisher. In addition to viewing each week's stories and accessing an archive, readers can check for updates for breaking news. The newspaper offices are located at The Journalism Lab inside the Spellmann Campus Center and is advised by the Lindenwood University School of Communications.

Sections
The Legacy offers local, campus, and city news stories, as well as state, regional, national, and international news stories in the News section located in the front part of the paper. Editorial is the opinion section of the paper with articles from Legacy staff and guest columnist submissions from students and faculty. The section also includes opinion poll question answers in a section titled Current Events Corner. Entertainment covers pop culture stories and movie reviews. Legacy Sports section appears in every issue and provides the latest scores and sports related news stories for the Lindenwood Lions, as well as local St. Louis sports.

References

External links
Lindenwood University Legacy online

Lindenwood University
Student newspapers published in Missouri
Publications established in 2007
2007 establishments in Missouri